Tyler Pierce may refer to:
 Tyler Pierce (actor)
 Tyler Pierce (figure skater)